The Hemiacridinae are a subfamily of Acrididae in the Orthoptera: Caelifera. Species can be found in Africa and Asia.

Tribes and genera 
The Orthoptera Species File lists the following:

Cranaeini
Authority: Brunner von Wattenwyl, 1893 - Malesia to New Guinea
 Cranae (grasshopper) Stål, 1878
 Cranaella Ramme, 1941
 Craneopsis Willemse, 1933
 Opiptacris Walker, 1870
 Paracranae Willemse, 1931 (monotypic)
 Phalaca Bolívar, 1906
 Philicranae Willemse, 1955 (monotypic)

Dirshacrini
Authority: Spearman, 2013 – southern Africa
 Dirshacris Brown, 1959
 Euloryma Spearman, 2013 (synonym Loryma Stål, 1878)
 Hemiloryma Brown, 1973
 Labidioloryma Grunshaw, 1986

Gergisini
Authority: Dirsh, 1962 - Madagascar
 Gergis (genus) Stål, 1875
 Malagasacris Rehn, 1944
 Morondavia Dirsh, 1962
 Pachyceracris Dirsh, 1962

Hemiacridini
Authority: Dirsh 1956 - Africa
 Hemiacris Walker, 1870
 Hemipristocorypha Dirsh, 1952
 Pristocorypha Karsch, 1896

Hieroglyphini
Authority: Bolívar, 1912 – Sahel, tropical Asia
 Hieroglyphodes Uvarov, 1922
 Hieroglyphus Krauss, 1877
 Parahieroglyphus Carl, 1916

Leptacrini
Authority: Johnston, 1956 – Africa, Asia
 Acanthoxia Bolívar, 1906
 Leptacris Walker, 1870
 Meruana Sjöstedt, 1909
 Sudanacris Uvarov, 1944

Mesopserini
Authority: Otte, 1995 – Africa including Madagascar
 Mesopsera Bolívar, 1908
 Xenippa Stål, 1878
 Xenippacris Descamps & Wintrebert, 1966

tribe not assigned
 Calamippa Henry, 1940
 Clonacris Uvarov, 1943
 Euthymia (genus) Stål, 1875
 Galideus Finot, 1908
 Glauningia: G. macrocephala Ramme, 1929
 Hysiella Bolívar, 1906
 Kassongia Bolívar, 1908
 Limnippa: L. ensicerca Uvarov, 1941
 Lopheuthymia Uvarov, 1943
 Onetes Rehn, 1944
 Oraistes: O. luridus Karsch, 1896
 Paulianiobia Dirsh & Descamps, 1968
 Proeuthymia Rehn, 1944
 Pseudoserpusia Dirsh, 1962
 Willemsella Miller, 1934
 Xenippella: X. bicolor Kevan, 1966
 Xenippoides: X. elongatus Chopard, 1952

References

External links 
 
 

Acrididae
Caelifera
Orthoptera subfamilies